(Who knows how near to me my end?), 27, is a church cantata by Johann Sebastian Bach. He composed it in Leipzig for the 16th Sunday after Trinity and first performed it on 6 October 1726.

History and words 
Bach composed the cantata in his fourth year in Leipzig for the 16th Sunday after Trinity. The prescribed readings for the day were from the Epistle to the Ephesians, and from the Gospel of Luke.

An unknown poet included in the first movement the first stanza of the chorale "" by Ämilie Juliane von Schwarzburg-Rudolstadt and closed the cantata with the first stanza of the hymn "" by Johann Georg Albinus.,

The chorale theme "Wer nur den lieben Gott läßt walten" (Zahn 2778) was first documented by Georg Neumark in Jena, but the melody can be likely traced back to Kiel, 1641. The five-part (SSATB) harmonization of the concluding chorale "Welt, ade! ich bin dein müde" is not by Bach but by Johann Rosenmüller (published for the first time in 's Geistliche Harffen-Klang, Leipzig, 1679).

Bach first performed the cantata in a service on 6 October 1726.

Scoring and structure 
The cantata is scored for four soloists—soprano, alto, tenor and bass—a four- or five-part choir, horn, three oboes, oboe da caccia, organ, two violins, viola, and basso continuo. The duration is given as 19 minutes.

Music 
The first movement of this cantata is "about as tragic as it gets": it is in a minor key and quickly sounds a strong dissonance between the oboe phrase and the continuo. Descending arpeggiated strings underline the "wails of the damned" represented by the oboes. After the opening ritornello, the vocal lines alternate between choir and solo presentations of the phrases of the chorale, with each voice (except the bass) having an arioso line.

A tenor recitative leads into a "shadowy" alto aria which echoes the first movement of Antonio Vivaldi's 'Spring' concert (published the year before, 1725), accompanied by an oboe da caccia. Chromaticism contributes to the "fleeting shadows" of the welcoming of death. The accompanying keyboard part has historically been played by either harpsichord or organ. The obbligato oboe conveys a number of different ideas: dancing, sighing, and "quasi-tragic" descent.

The soprano recitative uses word painting and sustained chordal harmonies to urge the listener into heaven. The bass aria then combines two contrasting sentiments: adieu and agitation. The repeated pairing of the "farewell theme – tumult theme" holds through both the opening ritornello and the vocal line, breaking only with the closing on the farewell theme alone.

The closing chorale includes two soprano parts and is stylistically reminiscent of an English madrigal.

Recordings 
 J. S. Bach: Kantaten 18 · 152, Jürgen Jürgens, Monteverdi-Chor, Leonhardt-Consort. Telefunken 1966.
 Bach Kantaten, Vol. 1: BWV 190a, BWV 84, BWV 89, BWV 27, Diethard Hellmann, Bachchor Mainz, Bachorchester Mainz. DdM-Records Mitterteich late 1960s?
 Bach Cantatas Vol. 4 – Sundays after Trinity I, Karl Richter, Münchener Bach-Chor, Münchener Bach-Orchester. Archiv Produktion 1977.
 Die Bach Kantate Vol. 51, Helmuth Rilling, Gächinger Kantorei, Bach-Collegium Stuttgart. Hänssler 1982.
 Bach Edition Vol. 11 – Cantatas Vol. 5, Pieter Jan Leusink, Holland Boys Choir, Netherlands Bach Collegium. Brilliant Classics 1999.
 Bach Cantatas Vol. 8: Bremen/Santiago, John Eliot Gardiner, Monteverdi Choir, English Baroque Soloists. Soli Deo Gloria 2000.
 J. S. Bach: Complete Cantatas Vol. 16, Ton Koopman, Amsterdam Baroque Orchestra & Choir. Antoine Marchand 2000.
 J. S. Bach: Christus, der ist mein Leben – Cantates BWV 27, 84, 95 & 161, Philippe Herreweghe, Collegium Vocale Gent. Harmonia Mundi France 2007.

References

External links 
 
  Wer weiß, wie nahe mir mein Ende BWV 27; BC A 138 / Sacred cantata (16th Sunday after Trinity) Bach Digital
 Cantata BWV 27 Wer weiß, wie nahe mir mein Ende? history, scoring, sources for text and music, translations to various languages, discography, discussion, Bach Cantatas Website
 BWV 27 – "Wer weiß, wie nahe mir mein Ende?" English translation, discussion, Emmanuel Music
 Luke Dahn: BWV 27.6 bach-chorales.com

Church cantatas by Johann Sebastian Bach
1726 compositions